Kyzylorda, formerly known as Kzyl-Orda, Ak-Mechet (Ак-Мечеть), Perovsk (Перовск), and Fort-Perovsky (Форт-Перовский), is a city in south-central Kazakhstan, capital of Kyzylorda Region and former capital of the Kazakh ASSR from 1925 to 1927.

The city has a population of 242,462 (2020 Census). It historically developed around the Syr Darya river and the site of a Kokand fortress. The population of the city with nearby villages is 312,861 (2020 Census).

History
A settlement existed under Seljuk, the founder of the Seljuk dynasty. The modern city had its beginnings in 1817 as the site of a Kokand fortress known as Ak-Mechet, or white mosque. The later-famous Yaqub Beg was once the fort's commander, but he was apparently not in command during the final battle. In 1853, during the Russian conquest of Turkestan, the fort was taken by Russian troops under General Vasily Perovsky. The Russians established a new fort and called it Fort-Perovsky, after the general.

The town of Perovsk in Russian Turkestan later developed around the fort. In 1925, the city was renamed Kzyl-Orda and was designated as the capital of the Kazak ASSR. The name literally means a red city, from the Turkic "кзыл" (red; used here in the common Soviet ideological connotation) and the Turkic Mongolian "орда" (city). In 1927 the capital was relocated to the southeastern region and Alma-Ata.

"Kyzylorda", the Kazakh-based romanized spelling, has been used since the late 20th century after the dissolution of the Soviet Union and Kazakhstan's independence in 1991.

Since independence, many of the outhouses were erected in several apartment buildings used as dormitories during Soviet rule due to lack of sewage systems for indoor plumbing. A RFE/RL report in April 2018 stated that the Kazakh Republic government was planning to modernize Soviet era buildings.

Climate
Kyzylorda has a cold desert climate (Köppen climate classification BWk) with hot summers and cold winters. Precipitation is low throughout the year, particularly in the summer months. Snow is common, though light, in winter.

Agriculture
Kyzylorda is known for its rice production. Many hundreds of hectares are devoted to rice production. Two rice mills operate in the city.

Education
Kyzylorda State University (KSU) after Korkyt ata is the leading center of education, a science and culture center in the Aral region of the Republic Kazakhstan. Established in 1950, the university trains highly skilled specialists in 54 specialties at 11 faculties.

Transportation

Kyzylorda has one airport. It has developed as the supply center of the important oilfields in the nearby Turgay Basin.

Tourism
Points of interest for tourists in the Kyzylorda region include the vanished Aral Sea and the Baikonur cosmodrome, archaeological excavations in Sauran and Shyganak, the memorial complex of Korkyt Ata, and several ancient mausoleums.

Notable people
Asim Thahit Abdullah Al Khalaqi (1968–2015), Yemeni formerly held in Guantanamo, given asylum by Kazakhstan in 2015
Vladimir Hotineanu (1950–2019), former Health Minister of Moldova
Eliezer Kulas (born 1944), Israeli politician
Oleg Tozoni (1927–2012), engineer and inventor
Marina Volnova (born 1989), Olympic boxer
Ilya Ilyin (born 1988), Olympic heavylifter
Batyrkhan Shukenov (1962–2015), Soviet, Kazakh-Russian singer
Mihhail Kõlvart (born 1977), mayor of Tallinn

Twin towns – sister cities

Kyzylorda is twinned with:
 Arvada, United States
 Bolu, Turkey
 Bursa, Turkey

References

Notes

Sources
Е. М. Поспелов (Ye. M. Pospelov). "Имена городов: вчера и сегодня (1917–1992). Топонимический словарь." (City Names: Yesterday and Today (1917–1992). Toponymic Dictionary." Москва, "Русские словари", 1993.

External links

History, facts and photos

Cities and towns in Kazakhstan
Populated places in Kyzylorda Region
Syr-Darya Oblast
Populated places established in 1820